Frederick John Priddle (October 9, 1908 – July 29, 1990) is a former collegiate men's head soccer coach. He is best known as the head men's soccer coach at Stanford University from 1954 to 1975. He posted a 133-119-2(.525) in 21 seasons at the helm. He remains the winningest coach in school history with 133 wins. He retired in 1976 after forty years of working for Stanford.

Priddle was born in Albany, New York on October 9, 1908. He married Irene Ruth Hauck in 1936. He died in Santa Cruz, California on July 29, 1990.

References

External links
https://web.archive.org/web/20120318031218/http://www.gostanford.com/sports/m-soccer/mtt/simon_bret00.html

Stanford Cardinal men's soccer coaches
1908 births
1990 deaths